Mary Spicer may refer to:

 Peggy Spicer, full name Mary Margaret Gore Spicer, (1908 – 1984), New Zealand artist.
 Nellie Spicer, full name Mary Nelson Spicer, (born 1987), American indoor volleyball player.